Glidden House may refer to:

 Joseph F. Glidden House, De Kalb, Illinois, NRHP-listed
 Glidden House (Bridger, Montana), listed on the NRHP in Carbon County, Montana
 Glidden House (Lee, New Hampshire), listed on the New Hampshire State Register of Historic Places
 Francis K. Glidden House, Cleveland, Ohio, listed on the NRHP in Cleveland, Ohio